The Three-Factor Eating Questionnaire (abbreviated as TFEQ) is a questionnaire often applied in food intake-behavior related research. It goes back to its publication in 1985 by Albert J. Stunkard and Samuel Messick.

The TFEQ contains 51 items (questions) and measures three dimensions of human eating behavior:
 'cognitive restraint of eating' (Factor I – 21 items)
 'disinhibition' (Factor II – 16 items)
 'hunger' (Factor III – 14 items)

Each item scores either 0 or 1 point. The minimum score for factors I-II-III is therefore 0-0-0, the possible maximum score 21-16-14.
There exist revised versions of this scale with reduced numbers of items: the TFEQ-R18 with 18 items and the TFEQ-R21 with 21 items.

See also 

 Binge Eating Scale
 Body Attitudes Test
 Body Attitudes Questionnaire
 Diagnostic classification and rating scales used in psychiatry
 Eating Disorder Inventory
 Eating Disorder Diagnostic Scale
 Eating Disorder Examination Interview
 Eating Attitudes Test
 SCOFF questionnaire

References 

Personality tests
Eating disorders screening and assessment tools